DeAngelo Malone (born July 12, 1999) is an American football outside linebacker for the Atlanta Falcons of the National Football League (NFL). He played college football at Western Kentucky.

Early life and high school
Malone grew up in Ellenwood, Georgia and originally attended Martin Luther King Jr. High School before transferring to Cedar Grove High School. He recorded 49 tackles with eight tackles for loss and was named first-team All-State and All-Metro by The Atlanta Journal-Constitution as Cedar Grove won the AAA state championship. Rated a three-star recruit, Malone committed to play college football at Western Kentucky over an offer from Buffalo.

College career
Malone became a starter for the Western Kentucky Hilltoppers during his freshman year and recorded 25 tackles, 1.5 sacks and five quarterback hurries. As a sophomore, he was named honorable mention All-Conference USA after finishing the season with 60 tackles, nine tackles for loss, six sacks, and eight quarterback hurries with two forced fumbles. In his junior season, Malone made 99 total tackles and was fourth in the nation with tackles 21 for loss and 12th in the nation with 11.5 sacks and also had 16 quarterback hurries and a fumble recovery returned for a touchdown. He was named the Conference USA Defensive Player of the Year and first-team All-Conference USA.

Malone considered entering the 2020 NFL Draft, but ultimately decided to return for his senior year. Malone entered senior season on the Chuck Bednarik Award and Bronko Nagurski Trophy watchlists and was named the preseason Conference USA Defensive Player of the Year and as one of the top five outside linebacker prospects for the 2021 NFL draft according to ESPN.

Professional career

Malone was drafted in the third round with the 82nd pick by the Atlanta Falcons in the 2022 NFL Draft. The Falcons previously obtained the pick in the trade that sent Matt Ryan to the Indianapolis Colts. Malone recorded his first professional sack in Week 7 against the Cincinnati Bengals.

Personal life
Malone is first cousins with Justin Shaffer who also was drafted by the Falcons in the 2022 NFL Draft.

References

External links
 Atlanta Falcons bio
Western Kentucky Hilltoppers bio

Living people
Players of American football from Atlanta
American football linebackers
Western Kentucky Hilltoppers football players
Atlanta Falcons players
1999 births